Saturnino Baltazar Osorio Zapata (6 January 1945 – 1980) was a footballer from El Salvador.

Club career
Ninón, as Osorio was called, played for Águila, Platense and Alianza. He was killed in Ciudad de Mejicanos, San Salvador by a salvadorean army check point.

International career
Osorio represented his country in 3 FIFA World Cup qualification matches and at the 1970 FIFA World Cup in Mexico.

References

External links
 http://www.laprensagrafica.com/2015/01/23/el-zaguero-que-perdio-el-duelo-ante-la-defensa-civil

1945 births
1980 deaths
Salvadoran footballers
El Salvador international footballers
1970 FIFA World Cup players
C.D. Águila footballers
Alianza F.C. footballers

Association football fullbacks